Luteipulveratus is a genus of bacteria from the family Dermacoccaceae.

References

 

Micrococcales
Bacteria genera